Excrescence may refer to:
 Excrescence (phonology), the addition of a consonant to a word
 In medicine and physiology, an outgrowth, especially of this skin, such as occurs in carnosity
 Excrescence (architecture), a term defined by the architect Ruskin to mean an  unpleasant addition to a building